Aegiphila schimpffii is a species of tree in the family Lamiaceae. It is endemic to Ecuador, where it is known from five populations. It occurs in coastal forest habitat and foothills up to 1000 meters in elevation.

References

schimpffii
Endemic flora of Ecuador
Endangered plants
Taxonomy articles created by Polbot